USS Haste (PG-92), was one of a group of Canadian corvettes turned over to the United States Navy and manned by the Coast Guard. She was laid down as CN-310 by Morton Engineering & Dry Dock Co., Quebec, Canada, and launched on 22 August 1942 as HMS  Mandrake. She was taken over by the US Navy, renamed Haste and commissioned on 6 April 1943.

Haste took up regular escort duties following shakedown, making ten voyages to Newfoundland or the Caribbean before November 1944. Small patrol ships such as Haste did much to lessen the effect of U-boat patrols on allied commerce during this critical period of the war. During the period November 1944—May 1945 the corvette served on patrol duty for 10-day periods out of New York. After making two more escort voyages to Newfoundland and return, the ship departed New York 2 July for Charleston, South Carolina, where she arrived 3 days later. Haste decommissioned 3 October 1945 and was returned to the Maritime Commission.

References

External links
USS Haste (PG-92)
Online: Gunboat Photo Archive - Haste (PG 92) ex-HMS Mandrake (K 287) ex-CN-310

World War II naval ships of the United States
Ships built in Quebec
1942 ships
Action-class gunboats